John Brownrigg may refer to:

 John Brownrigg (architect) (1911–2002), British architect
 John Studholme Brownrigg (1786–1853), English merchant and politician